Madonna of Avenue A  is a 1929 talking drama film directed by Michael Curtiz. It was produced and distributed by Warner Bros. It starred Dolores Costello in one of her first sound films. This is reportedly a lost film.

Cast
 Dolores Costello as Maria Morton
 Grant Withers as Slim Shayne
 Douglas Gerrard as Arch Duke
 Louise Dresser as Georgia Morton
 Otto Hoffman as Monk
 Lee Moran as Gus

See also
List of early Warner Bros. sound and talking features

References

External links
 
 
window card Madonna of Avenue A

1929 films
Films directed by Michael Curtiz
American silent feature films
1920s English-language films
1929 drama films
American black-and-white films
Warner Bros. films
Lost American films
American drama films
Films scored by Louis Silvers
1920 lost films
Lost drama films
1920s American films
Silent American drama films